Elia Bortoluz (born 29 March 1997) is an Italian professional footballer who plays as a forward for Serie D club Villa Valle.

Club career
Born in Mestre, Bortoluz started his career on Cittadella, and Torino youth system.

He joined to Serie D club Pro Patria for the 2016–17 season, and won the 2017–18 Serie D with the club.

On 24 July 2018, Bortoluz signed with Serie D club Pergolettese.

On 9 July 2022, Bortoluz moved to Serie D club Villa Valle.

Honours
Pro Patria
 Serie D: 2017–18

Pergolettese
 Serie D (Group D): 2018–19

References

External links
 
 

1997 births
Living people
Sportspeople from the Metropolitan City of Venice
Footballers from Veneto
Italian footballers
Association football forwards
Serie C players
Serie D players
Aurora Pro Patria 1919 players
U.S. Pergolettese 1932 players